Cowen or Cowan is a surname of both Irish and Jewish origins (see Cowan [surname] for further information).  Notable people with the surname include:

Barry Cowen (born 1967), Irish politician, son of Bernard Cowen
Bernard Cowen (1932–1984), Irish politician, father of Brian and Barry Cowen
Brian Cowen (born 1960), Irish Taoiseach, former Minister for Finance and Leader of the Fianna Fáil party, son of Bernard Cowen
Elise Cowen (1933–1962), American Beat poet
Frederic Hymen Cowen (1852–1935), British pianist, conductor, and composer
Joseph Cowen (1829–1900), English politician and journalist
Lenore Cowen (born ), American mathematician and computer scientist
Lillie Cowen (1850–1939), Jewish-Irish writer and Hebrew translator
Philip Cowen (1853–1943), Jewish-American newspaper publisher and immigration official
Robert Cowen (born 1930), Judge for the U.S. Court of Appeals for the Third Circuit
Scott Cowen (born 1946), president of Tulane University
Tyler Cowen (born 1962), American economist
Zelman Cowen (1919–2011), former Governor-General of Australia
Pete Cowen (born  1951), English golf coach

See also
 Cowan (surname)

Kohenitic surnames
Jewish surnames